Ambassador is a United Kingdom tea clipper built in 1869. She was a composite clipper, built with wooden planking over an iron skeleton and was W. Lund & Co's first tea clipper. She is now a beached wreck in southern Chile.

History
William Walker built Ambassador at Lavender Dry Dock in London.

Though considered a fast ship, Ambassador was said to be "very cranky and overmasted". Her first passage to the UK from Fuzhou came during the Tea Race of 1870 under Captain Duggan and took 115 days, a mediocre performance; that same year the fastest tea passage, also from Fuzhou, was made by the clipper  in just 98 days. Ambassadors fastest passage between China and England was 108 days, in 1872.

Ambassador has been beached at Estancia San Gregorio, Chile since 1899. In 1973 Chile declared her a historic monument.

The wreck is now reduced to a skeletal frame.

See also
Better preserved composite ship constructions include:
 , passenger clipper relocated from Scotland to Adelaide in 2014
 Cutty Sark (1869), tea-clipper in Greenwich, England
 , a Naval sloop in Chatham, England
  (1908), a paddle steamer at Goolwa on the River Murray, South Australia

References

1869 ships
Maritime incidents in Chile
National Monuments of Chile
Shipwrecks of Chile
Tea clippers
Individual sailing vessels
Victorian-era merchant ships of the United Kingdom